In geometry, the trigyrate rhombicosidodecahedron is one of the Johnson solids. It contains 20 triangles, 30 squares and 12 pentagons. It is also a canonical polyhedron.

It can be constructed as a rhombicosidodecahedron with three pentagonal cupolae rotated through 36 degrees. Related Johnson solids are:
 The gyrate rhombicosidodecahedron where one cupola is rotated;
 The parabigyrate rhombicosidodecahedron where two opposing cupolae are rotated;
 And the metabigyrate rhombicosidodecahedron where two non-opposing cupolae are rotated.

References
Norman W. Johnson, "Convex Solids with Regular Faces", Canadian Journal of Mathematics, 18, 1966, pages 169–200. Contains the original enumeration of the 92 solids and the conjecture that there are no others.
  The first proof that there are only 92 Johnson solids.

External links
 

Johnson solids